Askam is a railway station on the Cumbrian Coast Line, which runs between  and . It is owned by Network Rail and managed by Northern Trains.

History
Originally, the station was built here to transport the iron ore being mined in Askam out of the village.

The line
The railway along the Cumbrian coast was completed over many years by numerous small firms, who often would refuse to work together. However, eventually 'Grouping' forced the companies to work together on the railway, instead of constantly competing.
Further problems were encountered when the people building the railway ran out of money, and so the proposed Duddon Viaduct, from Askam to Millom, was abandoned. Instead, a different route, going by way of Foxfield, was planned. This saved £37,000.

The plans were drawn up in 1843, and shortly afterwards, sections of the Furness Railway were built. The original section through Askam, coming from Millwood Junction, and going on to Kirkby Slate Warf was part of the original railway line. This was officially opened on 3 June 1846 with the station name being Ireleth Gate. A passenger service then began operating on 24 August of that same year.

The station
Originally, there was a simple stop in Askam. This was abolished in 1859; the later growth of Askam meant that it soon deserved a full sized station. In 1876 the vicar of Askam complained at a shareholders' meeting of the passenger accommodation at Askam: They had both an up and down platform, but they were simply wooden railings with gravel banks. They were useful platforms, as they were used not only for passengers, but for cattle. On one side of the line, there was some slight covered accommodation, but in bad weather this was so thronged with men smoking and spitting that it was not suitable for ladies. On the other side, there was no covered accommodation, whatever, but the Station Master, like all other officials connected with the railway, was very kind to the public, by allowing them the use of the only room he had for living and cooking in.  (The Furness Railway's managing director responded that there were various plans for the improvement of the station, but nothing could be done until a dispute over the provision of a bridge at the station was resolved.)
The station that was built was actually originally designed for Millom, by Paley and Austin. The chalet-style station was opened on 1 April 1868.

Along with the station, sliding sheds were built next to the station. These were to store a banking locomotive, to aid trains with more than 16 wagons with the difficult climb to Lindal summit.

As well as carrying ore, there were dozens of smaller lines to practically every mine, furnace and factory in the area. For example, the Askam brick works had a 2 ft gauge line to transport clay. This line was operational until 1968.

Operational
Opened by the Furness Railway, it became part of the London, Midland and Scottish Railway during the Grouping of 1923. The station then passed to the London Midland Region of British Railways on nationalisation in 1948.

When Sectorisation was introduced in the 1980s, the station was served by Regional Railways, until the Privatisation of British Railways.

Facilities
The station is not staffed, but now has a ticket machine in place so intending travellers can buy tickets or a permit to travel before boarding the train. The main building is grade II listed, but is not in railway use. The platforms are linked by means of a barrier level crossing, controlled by a stone Furness Railway signal box on the northbound side. Train running announcements are provided by telephone, information screens and posters. Step-free access is only available to the southbound platform (as the opposite one is reached by a short flight of steps).

Services

Askam is one of the few mandatory stops on this section of the line (along with Corkickle, St Bees, Sellafield, Seascale, Ravenglass, Millom and Foxfield) and as a result all trains call here. There is an approximately hourly service in each direction from the station on Monday to Saturdays – southwards to Barrow-in-Furness and northwards to Millom. Most northbound ones run through to and from Whitehaven and Carlisle though one runs only as far as Sellafield.

A Sunday service was introduced at the May 2018 timetable change – the first for more than forty years.

Gallery

References

Sources

External links

 
 

Furness
Railway stations in Cumbria
DfT Category F2 stations
Former Furness Railway stations
Railway stations in Great Britain opened in 1846
Railway stations in Great Britain closed in 1857
Railway stations in Great Britain opened in 1868
Northern franchise railway stations
1851 establishments in England
1868 establishments in England